Yevgenia Nikolayevna Alissova-Klobukova ((24 July 1889 – 13 January 1962), was a Soviet botanist known for collecting and identifying at least six species of pteridophytes and spermatophytes with coauthor Vladimir Leontyevich Komarov.  

She was born in Varzi-Yatchi, Alnashsky District, Udmurtia.

References 

1889 births
1962 deaths
People from Alnashsky District
People from Yelabuzhsky Uyezd
Soviet women scientists
Soviet botanists
Place of death missing
Women botanists